Boyo may refer to :

 Places
 Boyo (department), a division of the Northwest province in Cameroon
 Bōyo Islands, a group of islands in the Inland Sea, Japan
 Boyo, a village in the Central African Republic
 People
 Billy Boyo (1969–2000), Jamaican reggae artist
 Ego Boyo (born 1968), Nigerian actress and movie producer
 Boyo Ockinga (active from 1986), New Zealand-born egyptologist, epigrapher and philologist working in Australia

 Other
 Boyo, an Irish and Welsh variation on the word boy
 Boyo v London Borough of Lambeth, a 1994 UK labour law case, concerning wrongful dismissal
 Boyo, a Surinamese dessert cake made of coconut and cassava.

See also